This is a list of United States Coast Guard historical and heritage sites that are open to the public. This list includes National Historic Landmarks (NHL), the National Register of Historic Places (NRHP), cutters, museums, monuments, memorials and more.  It includes only NHL Lighthouses.  There are many more resources dedicated to lighthouses, this list attempts to collect everything else in one list.  The United States Lighthouse Society, Lighthouse Friends and the many Wikipedia pages dedicated lighthouses are a few of the many excellent resources for those interested in lighthouses.  This list captures the most important historical features, that is the NHL and the often overlooked U.S. Coast Guard sites.

The Revenue Cutter Service is not as well represented in this list compared to the other constituent agencies; those other agencies had a head start.  The service did not even have a proper name for three-quarters of a century until 1863 when Congress voted to name them the "Revenue Cutter Service." The service established its first permanent shore infrastructure around 1900 at Curtis Bay, Maryland and it is still in operation today as the Coast Guard Yard.  Revenue cutters operated out of their respective port and were under the operational control of the Collector of Customs of that port.  Before Federal Income Tax, customs duties were the primary form of revenue, the customs house was often the hub of activity for the Federal Government in a harbor town.  Beyond the customs house and perhaps a pier, it is unlikely that more shoreside infrastructure was required in the early days.

The Sites are mapped in Open Street Map, recommend searching with the name, city, and state.

Atlantic

New England

Inland Waterways

Mid Atlantic

Southeast

Gulf of Mexico

Great Lakes

Pacific

California

Pacific Northwest

Pacific Islands 
No NHL, NRHP or other U.S. Coast Guard heritage sites open and accessible to the public.

Alaska 
No NHL, NRHP or other U.S. Coast Guard heritage sites open and accessible to the public.

Projects 
U.S. Coast Guard history and heritage under restoration or development.  Unknown whether any of these are open to the public.

All Regions

External links 

 Lighthouse Friends
 Museum Ships
 National Park Service Maritime Heritage Program
 National Register of Historic Places
 Naval History and Heritage Command
 U.S. Coast Guard Historian's Office
 U.S. Life Saving Service Heritage Association
 U.S. Lighthouse Society

References 

United States Coast Guard lists
History of the United States Coast Guard
Closed facilities of the United States Coast Guard
United States Revenue Cutter Service
United States Life-Saving Service
Lighthouses in the United States
Sea rescue organizations